Bear Island is an  island located in Maine.  It is one of the five islands of the Town of Cranberry Isles, Maine.  The island is located just off Northeast Harbor, Maine and south of Mount Desert Island.

Bear Island Light sits on the west end of the island. It was built in 1889 and staffed until 1981.  The lighthouse is now a private aid to navigation and a private residence.  The rest of the island has belonged to the Dunbar family since 1884 (or 1886) after it was bought by Harvard professor Charles F. Dunbar.

References 

Islands of Hancock County, Maine
Islands of Maine
Coastal islands of Maine